Night Visitor is a 1989 horror film.

Night Visitor may also refer to:

The Night Visitor, a 1971 Swedish psychological thriller film
The Night Visitor, a 1967 story by B. Traven
The Night Visitor (album), a 2011 album by Anna Ternheim